Bharath Sriraman (born 1971) is an Indian-born Professor of Mathematical Sciences at the University of Montana – Missoula and an academic editor, known for his interdisciplinary contributions at the nexus of math-science-arts, theory development in mathematics education, creativity research, and gifted education.

Education and honors
Bharath Sriraman graduated with a B.S. in mathematics from the University of Alaska Fairbanks in 1995. He obtained his M.S in Mathematics in 1999 followed by a PhD in Mathematical Sciences in 2002 both from Northern Illinois University under the analyst Robert Wheeler. In 2009, Northern Illinois University named him as one of 50 "Golden alumni" in the last 50 years for his significant contributions to research in mathematics education, gifted education and interdisciplinary research at the intersection of mathematics-science-arts. He previously received the School Science and Mathematics Association Early Scholar Award in 2007. In 2016 he was the recipient of the University of Montana Distinguished Scholar Award.

Academic and editorial work 
Sriraman is the founder and editor-in-chief of The Mathematics Enthusiast, an independent open access journal hosted by University of Montana. He is the co-founder/co-editor-in-chief of two series with Springer Science+Business Media namely Advances in Mathematics Education and Creativity Theory and Action in Education. In addition to editing he is a prolific scholar with over 300 publications to date in numerous areas of research, and held numerous visiting professorships including those as International Fulbright Specialist at institutions in Nordic countries, Eurasia and South America. He also holds an adjunct appointment in the department of Central and Southwest-Asian Studies at the University of Montana

Bibliography of Edited Works (selection)

Interdisciplinary works

History and Philosophy of Mathematics

International mathematics education 
Sriraman, B., Bergsten, C., Goodchild, S., Palsdottir, G., et al. (2010): The First Sourcebook on Nordic Research in Mathematics Education: Norway, Sweden, Iceland, Denmark and Contributions from Finland  Information Age Publishing, Charlotte, NC.
Sriraman, B., Cai, J., Lee, K., et al. (2015): The First Sourcebook on Asian Research in Mathematics Education: China, Korea, Japan, Singapore, Malaysia and India. Information Age Publishing, Charlotte, NC.

Creativity 
Sriraman, B., &Lee, K. (2011): The Elements of Creativity and Giftedness in Mathematics.  Sense Publishers, The Netherlands.
Beghetto, R. &Sriraman, B. (2017): Creative Contradictions in Education: Cross disciplinary paradoxes and perspectives, Springer International, Switzerland,

Gifted education 
Ambrose, D., Sriraman, B., Cross, T. (2013): The Roeper School: A Model for Holistic Development of High Ability, Sense Publishers, Rotterdam, Netherlands,

References

External links 
 
 

1971 births
Living people
20th-century Indian mathematicians
American mathematicians
Scientists from Bangalore
Academic journal editors
University of Montana faculty
Northern Illinois University alumni
University of Alaska Fairbanks alumni
Indian emigrants to the United States
Creativity researchers